Muhammad Fadzri Abd Rashid (born 19 September 1986), professionally known as Fakkah Fuzz, is a Singaporean stand-up comedian and television personality.

On January 26, 2018, his Netflix stand-up comedy special Almost Banned was released worldwide.

References

External links 
 Official web page

Singaporean television personalities
1986 births
Living people

Singaporean people of Malay descent
Singaporean comedians